Iver Gunnar Nordseth (born 2 May 1951) is a Norwegian politician for the Liberal Party.

He served as a deputy representative to the Norwegian Parliament from Møre og Romsdal during the terms 1997–2001 and 2005–2009.

On the local level he is mayor of Smøla municipality since 1991. Since 2003 he is also a member of Møre og Romsdal county council.

References

1951 births
Living people
Deputy members of the Storting
Liberal Party (Norway) politicians
Mayors of places in Møre og Romsdal
Place of birth missing (living people)